James Deacon (23 January 1906 – 1976) was a Scottish footballer, who played in the Football League.

Career
Deacon began his league career with Darlington, making two appearances in the Third Division before joining Second Division Wolverhampton Wanderers in June 1929 for £250.

He scored on his Wolves debut, a 2–2 draw at Bradford City on 7 September 1929, and quickly formed a potent attack with Billy Hartill, scoring 42 goals as a duo that season. Deacon reached double figures in goals in all but his final full season at Molineux, and won a Second Division championship medal in 1931–32. His younger brother Dickie also played for the club during this spell.

He scored a total of 56 goals in 158 appearances for Wolves, before being transferred to Southend United in October 1934. He made over a century of appearances for Southend, before playing out his career with a season at Hartlepool in 1939–40.

After World War II, he returned to his native Glasgow where he ran a pub.

References
 

1906 births
1976 deaths
Footballers from Glasgow
Scottish footballers
English Football League players
Darlington F.C. players
Wolverhampton Wanderers F.C. players
Southend United F.C. players
Hartlepool United F.C. players
Association football forwards